Blakes is an unincorporated community in Serena Township, LaSalle County, Illinois, United States.

References

Unincorporated communities in LaSalle County, Illinois
Unincorporated communities in Illinois